Thanasis Tribonias (2 May 1984 – 24 July 2012) was a Greek footballer and Special Guard of the Hellenic Police. He played professionally for Haidari FC in the Beta Ethniki.

Playing career
Tribonias was born in Agios Dimitrios, a village in the Argolis prefecture of Greece. He started his career at his local team Pammetohikos and when he was 16 years old he joined Nafplio-based Diovouniotis.

In 2005, he moved to Haidari – there he managed to make a total of 81 appearances for the club, 52 of which in the Beta Ethniki, as well as 3 appearances in the Greek Cup. In September 2009, Tribonias was released from Haidari and joined Delta Ethniki side Nea Ionia for a year.

Personal life
Tribonias was a member of the Hellenic Police's Motorcycle Patrol Unit in Athens. On 24 July 2012, he and childhood friend and colleague Nikos Piteros were fatally injured in a traffic accident on Mesogeion Avenue while on duty when they lost control of their motorcycle.

References

1984 births
2012 deaths
People from Epidaurus
Greek footballers
Chaidari F.C. players
Association football defenders
Hellenic Police officers
Road incident deaths in Greece
Motorcycle road incident deaths
Footballers from the Peloponnese